El Desengaño Airport  is an airport serving El Desengaño, a village on the Apere River in the Beni Department of Bolivia.

See also

Transport in Bolivia
List of airports in Bolivia

References

External links 
OpenStreetMap - El Desengaño
OurAirports - El Desengaño Airport
HERE/Nokia - El Desengaño
Google Maps - El Desengaño

Airports in Beni Department